The Filmfare Best Special Effects Award is given by the Filmfare magazine as part of its annual Filmfare Awards for Hindi films. It was first awarded in the year 2007 where 5 films Dhoom 2, Don - The Chase Begins Again, Jaan-E-Mann, Krrish and Rang De Basanti were nominated, and Krrish became the eventual winner of the award.

List

References

Special Effects